Kalak Bisheh-ye Sadiq (also Romanized as Kalaḵ Bīsheh-ye Sādiq) is a village in Malavi Rural District, in the Central District of Pol-e Dokhtar County, Lorestan Province, Iran. At the 2006 census, its population was 64, in 14 families.

References 

Towns and villages in Pol-e Dokhtar County